Drosophila acanthomera is a species of fruit fly in the genus Drosophila.

References 

acanthomera
Insects described in 2001